WGNJ is a Christian radio station licensed to St. Joseph, Illinois, broadcasting on 89.3 MHz FM.  WGNN serves East-Central Illinois, including the Champaign-Urbana, and Danville, Illinois areas, as well as West-Central Indiana, including Covington, Indiana. The station is owned by Great News Radio, through licensee Good News Radio, Inc., and is managed by Mark Burns.

Relay stations
Since June 2020, following Good News Radio's purchase of WLUJ in Springfield, WGNJ's programming has been simulcast on five different frequencies in that area.

References

External links
WGNJ's official website

GNJ
Champaign County, Illinois